The Norwegian Fjordhorse Center (Norwegian: Norsk Fjordhest Senter) is the national resource center of the Fjord Horse breed in Norway. The center was established in 1989 and is owned by the Norwegian Fjord Horse Association, Stad Municipality and the Vestland County authority. The main goal of the center is to promote the breeding and usage of the horses.

The center is a resource center for the breed, offering information and advisory services regarding all disciplines connected to the horses. There is also course activity throughout the year. Every year the center hosts an exhibition for stallions, mares, geldings and young horses.

Activities 
The Fjordhorse Center offers a wide range of activities for visitors at the center. The tourism sector in Nordfjordeid is strong, cruise tourists are offered riding trips up the mountains around the town, and children are able to pet the horses.

The facilities are also used as a teaching venue for the Fjordane Folk High School also situated in Nordfjordeid. The school offers a horse program.

Stallion Show 
The stallion show is held in Mai annually in Nordfjordeid. The stallions will receive grades for the following aspects: type and character, physique and muscles, bone position and bone quality, movements and integrity of the exterior, based on the goals in the breeding plan. Stallions and owners from several different countries, especially the United States, United Kingdom and Germany travel to the show.

Conservation 
The Norwegian Genetic Resource Center coordinates activities within the conservation and use of national genetic resources, and has the task of monitoring status and contributing to the efficient management of the genetic resources in livestock, useful plants and forest trees in Norway. The responsibility for this work on horses is assigned to the Norwegian Fjordhorse Center, which has an advisory and executive function for the breeding organizations. The Norwegian Fjordhorse Center reports to LMD, and also reports annual key figures to the Norwegian Genetic Resource Center.

References 

Horse breeding organizations
Equestrian organizations
Norwegian equestrians
Horse breeding and studs